Climate change in Liberia causes many problems as Liberia is particularly vulnerable to climate change. Like many other countries in Africa, Liberia both faces existing environmental issues, as well as sustainable development challenges. Because of its location in Africa, it is vulnerable to extreme weather, the coastal effects of sea level rise, and changing water systems and water availability. Climate change is expected to severely impact the economy of Liberia, especially agriculture, fisheries, and forestry. Liberia has been an active participant in international and local policy changes related to climate change.

Impacts on the natural environment

Temperature and weather changes

Sea level rise 

60% of the population of Liberia lives along the coast. Sea level rise is expected to put pressure on a number of populations, including communities in slums such as the West Point Slum, and incur losses of US$250 million.

Water resources 
High evaporation, changes in seasonal rainfall patterns, and runoff increases are expected to lead to decreased water and worse water quality. Additionally, by the 2020s the Mount Coffee Hydropower Project is expected to have challenges with maintaining water supply. Moreover, sea level rise is expected to cause increase salinization in important coastal communities.

Impacts on people

Economic impacts

Agriculture 
61% of the GDP and 75% of employment is in the agriculture sector. Climate change is expected to exacerbate extreme weather and decrease crop yields, resulting in food insecurity.

Mitigation and adaptation

Policies and legislation 
The Liberian Environmental Protection Agency launched a national response plan in 2018.

International cooperation 
Liberia was one of the first recipients of the Green Climate Fund, and received significant funding in 2014 from Norway in order to address forestry practices, fossil fuel subsidies, and renewable energy in the country.

See also
Climate change in Africa

References 

Liberia
Environment of Liberia
Liberia